Gibberella stilboides is a nectriacine fungus. It is a plant pathogen, and causes collar rot in coffee seedings.

References

External links 
 Index Fungorum
 USDA ARS Fungal Database

Fungal plant pathogens and diseases
stilboides
Fungi described in 1924